Matthew Turner (June 17, 1825 – February 10, 1909) was an American sea captain, shipbuilder and designer. He constructed 228 vessels, of which 154 were built in the Matthew Turner shipyard in Benicia. He built more sailing vessels than any other single shipbuilder in America, and can be considered "the 'grandaddy' of big time wooden shipbuilding on the Pacific Coast."

Early life
Matthew Turner was born in Geneva, Ohio on June 17, 1825, the fourth child of George Turner and Emily Atkins. George Turner owned a sawmill on the shores of Lake Erie and later launched his first ship, the sloop Geneva, in 1839, to ship lumber and building stone. Matthew, after watching the construction of the Geneva and a later vessel the Philena Mills, designed his first ship, the schooner G.R. Roberts. His father was sufficiently impressed with the design to build the boat, which was launched in 1848. Matthew took on the command of the boat and later that year married Amanda Jackson. Amanda died in childbirth with their first child. On a trip down the Mississippi river in late 1849 he heard about gold mining in California and set off for the West Coast in 1850. He spent 3½ years mining gold in Calaveras County and was quite successful.

Career as ship captain
Turner later travelled to New York where he bought the schooner Toronto, sailing her back to California. There he went into business with Captain Richard Thomas Rundle and started shipping timber to San Francisco from the Mendocino coast. They were soon able to replace the Toronto with another larger schooner, the Louis Perry, and a few years later they purchased the brig Temandra. When Turner took this larger vessel to the Sea of Okhotsk he noticed the abundance of cod and so bought the Porpoise to capitalize on this, as cod were selling in San Francisco at a high price. Meanwhile, Turner also set up a company to trade with Tahiti.

During his career as a ship's captain he twice received recognition of his heroism and the services that he rendered to foreign governments. He was given a gold-mounted spyglass by Queen Victoria in recognition of his part in saving the lives of British sailors. The Norwegian government presented him with a silver service for his rescue of a Norwegian vessel in danger of foundering at Honolulu.

Shipyard in Benicia
He designed his first ocean-going ship, the  brig Nautilus, in 1868, which was built at Eureka, in an attempt to get a faster ship for the Tahiti run. The hull of Nautilus was exactly the reverse of what was customary in the area at that time, being "long and sharp forward, lean and full on the waterline aft." Despite the predictions of sceptics that the ship would dive and pitch into the water, resulting in a very wet ride, Nautilus proved a great success. Turner decided to move into shipbuilding, setting up a yard near Hunter's Point with his brother Horatio. In 1876 he married for a second time, to Captain Rundle's widow, Ashbeline. The success of his first shipyard led him to search for another location, to allow the business to expand. He went into business with his brother and John Eckley, forming the Matthew Turner Shipyard at Benicia in 1883. This yard constructed at least 154 wooden-hulled ships.

Turner was greatly admired by shipbuilder Henry Hall, of the Hall Brothers shipyard in Port Blakely. He described the "Turner Model" of sailing rig, using the Bermudan sail, a "fore and aft sail without gaff, being a large triangular sail." Eliminating the gaff made it much easier to bring the sail down during sudden Pacific squalls.

Prolific shipbuilder

During his career as a shipbuilder, Turner designed and built 228 sea going vessels in a period of 37 years, from 1868 to 1905, more sailing vessels than any other American shipbuilder. According to Gibbs, "although many [vessels] were small in size, this record was probably never equalled by any other individual shipbuilder in the American era of sail. He further, in all probability, built more vessels for foreign account than any other American since the Revolution." Turner had business interests in the South Sea Islands, and many of his ships were built for owners in that region. He also specialized in vessels for pelagic sealing. "Turner also built some of the fastest racing yachts in the world, proven out during the famous races sponsored by the San Francisco Yacht Club, of which Turner was a charter member."

Later life
Turner was something of an invalid from 1904 onwards. Nonetheless, in 1906, at age 81, Turner, was still personally supervising work at his shipyard, and found himself suddenly swamped with work following the San Francisco earthquake. He decided to retire. He died on February 10, 1909, at the age of 83 years after a short illness at his home in Oakland.

Legacy
Gibbs reports that Turner's influence on the South Seas schooner was still evident as late as 1941, when a two-masted schooner, Benicia, built in Tahiti by a shipwright who had worked in Turner's yard, arrived in San Francisco under the French flag.

History in the Making: The legacy of Matthew Turner is being honored with the construction of a new wooden tall ship bearing his name. The 132-foot Brigantine Schooner, set to launch in 2016 is inspired by Matthew Turner's classic vessel, "Galilee"

Call of the Sea: When complete the "Matthew Turner" will join the fleet of "Call of the Sea" a non-profit organization started by Captain Alan Olson.  "Call of the Sea" based in Sausalito, California is dedicated to preserving maritime traditions and teaching the skills of seamanship and teamwork through its experiential sailing programs.

Bypassing the petroleum era and embracing new technologies: No fossil fuels will be used for normal operations of the new "Matthew Turner”. Wind Power will provide basic propulsion.  Wind Power will also generate power for the DC electric motors to be used when winds are insufficient. The new "Matthew Turner" will be the "greenest" wooden tall ship ever built.  Every aspect of construction, from the FSC certified lumber to the latest non-toxic paints, has been scrutinized to minimize negative environmental impacts.

The Matthew Turner was completed in March 2017, built entirely by volunteer workers and funded by private donations. It will be used primarily as an educational aid.

The Matthew Turner was launched April 1, 2017 in Sausalito.

Notable ships built by Turner

 Anna, a schooner with a ten-day run from Honolulu to San Francisco in 1886, and eight round trips, San Francisco to Kahului in 357 days 
 Amaranth - Four-masted barquentine that broke the record for the Astoria, Oregon to Shanghai run (23 days). Wrecked at Jarvis Island on August 30, 1913.
 Ariel - Four-masted schooner built by Matthew Turner in 1900. She was wrecked at Inuboyesaki, Japan, in 1917.
 Benicia, a barquentine with a fast passage from Newcastle, New South Wales to Kihei, Hawaiʻi, of 35 days 
 Equator - Schooner that was chartered by Robert Louis Stevenson and helped inspire his book The Wrecker
 Emma Claudina, 126 ft., 266 ton brigantine, the first ship of the Matson Line, named for the daughter of John D. Spreckels
 Galilee - Brigantine that holds the record for the Tahiti-San Francisco run in a wooden-hulled sailing vessel (22 days), converted to magnetic observatory when under charter to the Carnegie Institution of Washington Department of Terrestrial Magnetism for three years
 Geneva, a brigantine with a passage of 2 days between Launceston, Tasmania and Newcastle, New South Wales 
 [[John D. Spreckles (ship)|John D. Spreckels]], a 266 ton brigantine with "at least three ten day voyages on the San Francisco-Hawaiian Island run" 
 HMCS Karluk - Brigantine whaler that was acquired by the Canadian government as flagship to the Canadian Arctic Expedition
 Lurline, a 135-foot brigantine made for Claus Spreckels in 1887, who sold immediately 75% to William Matson as an expansion of Matson Lines. They resold the vessel in 1896. The brig was lost in 1915.
 Nautilus, 104 t., 173 ton brig, fast passage from Tahiti to San Francisco of 20 days 
 Papeete, schooner with a 17 day passage from San Francisco to Tahiti 
 Pitcairn, schooner built by Turner for the Seventh-day Adventists
 Solano, fast passage from Shanghai to Port Townsend, Washington of 24 days in April 1902. Wrecked on North Beach (the ocean side of Long Beach Peninsula), February 5, 1907.
 William G. Irwin, a sugar packet built in 1881 for J.D. Spreckels. Launched as a brigantine, later re-rigged as a three masted schooner. Fast passages from San Francisco to Kahului, Hawaiʻi, 8 days 17 hours, 1881, Honolulu to San Francisco, 9 days 
 W.H. Dimond'', a brigantine with a 9-day, 10-hour passage from San Francisco to Honolulu

References

External links

Park
Map of Matthew Turner Shipyard Park
Turner/Robertson Shipyard, 1883-1918, California State Historic Landmark 973. "The yard sways, and the Whaler Stamboul, used as a shipyard work platform, are visible at low tide."
Photograph of plaque at site of Turner Shipyard
Mission Bay location of first Turner Shipyard

School
Who was Matthew Turner, and Why Was a School Named After Him?
Matthew Turner Elementary School, Benicia, CA

Ships
Herman, Matthew Turner Built Sealing Schooner 
John D. Spreckles, codfish schooner involved in a collision off Pt. Reyes
The Matson Brigantine Lurline, first ship of the Matson Line, purchased from J.D. Spreckels
Ship Model, Steam Schooner Royal, 1891 fishing schooner
Santa Cruz, Turner-built schooner shipwrecked at Santa Cruz Island, 1913
Matthew Turner, Currently under construction in Sausalito, CA, 2015

Further reading
. Contains a chapter on Turner.

American shipbuilders
Ships built in Benicia, California
Sea captains
Merchant ships of the United States
Maritime history of California
History of Tahiti
History of Solano County, California
People of the California Gold Rush
People from Geneva, Ohio
1825 births
1909 deaths